Barnabé Delarze (born 30 June 1994) is a Swiss rower. He competed in the men's quadruple sculls event at the 2016 Summer Olympics and in the men's double sculls at the 2020 Summer Olympics.

References

External links
 

1994 births
Living people
Swiss male rowers
Olympic rowers of Switzerland
Rowers at the 2016 Summer Olympics
Rowers at the 2020 Summer Olympics
Place of birth missing (living people)
World Rowing Championships medalists for Switzerland
European Rowing Championships medalists